The following is a timeline of the history of the city of El Paso, Texas.

Prior to 20th century

 1598 The first Thanksgiving in North America celebrated by Spanish explorer Juan de Oñate and his expedition on April 30, 1598.
 1682 – Ysleta Mission established.
 1827 - Juan María Ponce de León is given a land grant for what is now downtown El Paso.
 1849 – U.S. military Fort Bliss established.
 1850 – El Paso County created, which originally extended north to what is now Garfield, New Mexico, and extending all the way to the Pecos River
 1859 - Anson Mills surveys and lays out a town on Ponce's Rancho and names it El Paso, the layout of Downtown El Paso still follows this original plan
 1873 – El Paso incorporated.
 1876 – Lone Star newspaper begins publication.
 1881
 Southern Pacific Railroad begins operating.
 El Paso Times and El Paso Herald newspapers begin publication.
 1882 – Avenida Lerdo–Stanton Street Bridge and Montgomery Building constructed.
 1883 – First National Bank built.
 1884
 El Paso County seat relocated to El Paso from Ysleta.
 El Paso Browns baseball team formed.
 1888 - El Paso del Norte renamed "Juárez" in honor of Benito Juárez. leaving El Paso, Texas the sole El Paso.
 1889 – McGinty Club active.
 1890 – Population: 10,338.
 1892 – Santa Fe Street bridge built.
 1895 – El Paso Public Library founded.
 1899 – American Smelting and Refining Company plant in operation.
 1900 – White House Department Store in business.

20th century

1900s–1940s
 1901 – El Paso Electric Company formed.
 1902
 Electric streetcar begins operating.
 Popular Dry Goods Department Store in business.
 1904 - Carnegie Library opens.
 1906 – Union Depot opens.
 1910 – Population: 39,279.
 1911 – Anson Mills Building constructed.
 1912 – Hotel Paso del Norte in business.
 1913 – Several hundred workers at the American Smelting and Refining Company's plant go on strike.
 1914
 Roman Catholic Diocese of El Paso established.
 Texas State School of Mines and Metallurgy opens.
 1916 - El Paso High School opens
 1917 
 Bath Riots occurred to protest new U.S. immigration/entry requirements for Mexican's crossing the border.
 Cathedral Parish of Saint Patrick dedicated.
 1919 – June 15–16: Battle of Ciudad Juárez occurs near El Paso.
 1920 – Population: 77,560.
 1921 – Ku Klux Klan active.
 1922 – El Paso Post newspaper begins publication.
 1924 – United States Border Patrol begins operating.
 1925 – Cathedral High School established.
 1926 – Orndorff Hotel built.
 1928 – El Paso Municipal Airport built.
 1929 - KTSM and WDAH radio begin broadcasting.
 1930
 Bassett Tower built.
 Plaza Theatre and El Paso Zoo open.
 Austin High School opens.
 Hilton Hotel in business.
 Population: 102,421.
 1933 – Junior League of El Paso founded.
 1935 – Sun Bowl football contest begins.
 1936 – United States Court House built.
 1937
 El Paso Mothers' Health Center opens.
 Kress Building constructed.
 1938 – El Paso Ysleta Port of Entry established.
 1939 – Fort Bliss National Cemetery established near city.
 1940
 El Paso Star built.
 Population: 96,810 city; 131,067 county.
 1942
 Biggs Air Force Base begins operating near Fort Bliss.
 Ysleta–Zaragoza Bridge rebuilt.
 El Paso County Coliseum opens.
 1945 - Household Furniture Opens 
 1946 – El Paso Drive-in cinema opens.
 1948 – First city flag adopted.
 1949 – Texas State School of Mines and Metallurgy becomes Texas Western College

1950s–1990s
 1950
 Bronco Drive-In cinema opens.
 Population: 130,485.
 1952
 KROD-TV (television) begins broadcasting.
 Town of Anthony incorporated near El Paso.
 1953 - KTSM-TV (television) begins broadcasting.
 1954 – El Paso County Historical Society founded.
 1957- First Hispanic Mayor (Raymond Telles) is elected
 1959
 El Paso Museum of Art founded.
 Sunland Park Racetrack opens in nearby Sunland Park, New Mexico.
 1960
 El Paso Aerial Tramway begins operating.
 Northgate Mall opens with "acres of parking"
 Population: 276,687.
 1961 – Village of Vinton incorporated near El Paso.
 1962
 Bassett Place shopping mall in business.
 Chase Tower built.
 New city flag adopted.
 1963 – Sun Bowl stadium opens.
 1965
 U.S. Supreme Court decides El Paso v. Simmons contract-related lawsuit.
 Fox Theatre (cinema) opens.
 1967
 Cordova Bridge built. 
 Texas Western College becomes University of Texas at El Paso.
 El Paso BOTA Port of Entry built per Chamizal treaty.
 1969 – San Jacinto Plaza remodelled.
 1970 – Population: 322,261.
 1971
 El Paso Genealogical Society founded.
 Wells Fargo Plaza hi-rise built.
 1972
 September: Raza Unida Party convention held in El Paso.
 El Paso Community College established.
 1973 – Biggs Air Force Base becomes Biggs Army Airfield at Fort Bliss.
 1974
 Civic Center opens.
 Cielo Vista Mall, first enclosed air-conditioned shopping center, opens.
 Chamizal National Memorial established.
 1977 – El Paso Museum of Archaeology established.
 1980
 Mujer Obrera (labor group) established.
 Population: 425,259 city; 479,899 county.
 1981
 Foreign trade zone established.
 "Sandra Day O'Connor, a native of El Paso, becomes the first woman U.S. Supreme Court Justice."
 1983 – Kayser Building constructed.
 1987
 Franklin Mountains State Park opens.
 Sun Metro Mass Transit System active.
 1988
 Sunland Park Mall in business.
 Horizon City incorporated near El Paso.
 1989 – El Paso Patriots soccer team formed.
 1990 – Population: 515,342 city; 591,610 county.
 1997 – Silvestre Reyes becomes U.S. representative for Texas's 16th congressional district.
 1998 – City website online (approximate date).
 1999 – Chihuahuan Desert Gardens established.
 2000 – Population: 563,662 city; 679,622 county.

21st century

 2003
 Carolina Park skatepark opens.
 Cinemark West cinema in business.
 2004 – International news media reports on ongoing female homicides in Juarez City area.
 2005
 El Diario de El Paso Spanish-language newspaper begins publication.
 2006
 Railroad and Transportation Museum of El Paso established.
 Major flooding from up to 10 inches of rain in one week.
 2007
 El Paso Marathon begins.
 El Paso Skatepark Association formed.
 El Paso Star remodeled.
 2008 – Borderzine website launched.
 2010
 December 17: Mexican drone crashes down in El Paso.
 Population: 649,121 city; 800,647 county.
 2011 – Worst drought in a decade.
 2013
 ASARCO smokestacks demolished.
 City Hall demolished to make room for Southwest University Park baseball stadium.
 2019
 El Paso Massacre in Cielo vista mall.

See also
 History of El Paso, Texas
 List of mayors of El Paso, Texas
 History of Ciudad Juárez, Mexico
 Timeline of Ciudad Juárez, Mexico
 National Register of Historic Places listings in El Paso County, Texas
 Timelines of other cities in the West Texas area of Texas: Abilene, Amarillo, Lubbock, Midland

References

Bibliography

Published in the 19th century
 
 
  1886–1899

Published in 20th century
  1901–1905
 
 
 
 Mills, W. W., Forty Years at El Paso, Carl Hertzog, 1962
 
 Jones, Harriot Howze, El Paso A Centennial Portrait, El Paso County Historical Society, 1973
 
 
 W. H. Timmons, El Paso A Borderlands History, Texas Western Press, The University of Texas at El Paso 1990

Published in 21st century

External links

 
 Items related to El Paso, Texas, various dates (via Digital Public Library of America)
 Fun in the 1890s: The McGinty Club Borderlands (EPCC)
 
 
 
 

 
el paso